Dirty, Yellow, Darkness (also known as Premaya Nam in Sri Lanka and certain Asian countries) is a 2017 Sri Lankan psychological drama film written and directed by Kalpana Ariyawansha and Vindana Ariyawansha. Produced by Kalpana Ariyawansha (under his banner East West Entertainment), Prem Dissanayake, Athula Mahawalage, and Sujeewa Wijesinghe. The film stars Shyam Fernando, Samanalee Fonseka in lead roles along with Suranga Ranawaka, Buddhadasa Vithanarachchi and Sathis Wijemanne in supportive roles. It is the 1270th Sri Lankan film in the Sinhala cinema.

The film portrays after his wife leaves, a man with a severe case of OCD, admits himself to a mental hospital for treatment to overcome his fear and to win his wife back. Rohana Weerasinghe composed the film's score and soundtrack. Kularatne Ariyawansa and Prasanna Vithanage are being as the executive producers in the film.

The first look was released in 5th Beijing International Film Festival 2015 and it has been selected as an official selection from Sri Lanka by 18th Shanghai International Film Festival 2015. The film had a local release on 17 February 2017.

Plot

Vishwa (Shyam Fernando) is a director in an advertisement marketing company. Vishwa realizes that his mentality is somewhat abnormal from others. Vishwa stated his condition to Samadi, his wife (Samanalee Fonseka), before their marriage. After the marriage, his condition worsened, and he refuses to take his medicine. He starts to believe that when he pees, it will get all over him and his surroundings. So he wants to take a bath every time after he pees and wants to buy new clothes. He thinks that his old clothes have germs. With this condition, he gets troubled by his personal life and his professional career.

With bathing after each time urinating, he is noticed by his chief in charge of his working place. His close friends know his condition but his officer in charge doesn't know about his condition and that he is taking medicine. With resigning from the office, he stays at home with not taking medicine. Due to this condition, his wife Samadi leaves the house. In that point, he gets to know the depth of his mental condition and wants to live together with his wife again. Due to these reasons, he admits himself to a mental hospital for treatment to overcome his fear and to win his wife back.

Cast
 Shyam Fernando as Vishwa
 Samanalee Fonseka as Samadi
 Suranga Ranawaka as Nurse Inoka
 Buddhadasa Vithanarachchi as Samadi's Father
 Nimal Jayasinghe as Vishwa's Father
 Prema Pathiraja as Vishwa's Mother
 Chandrika Hettiarachchi as Samadi's Mother
 Bibishana Kurera as Dayapala
 Ranjith Kadupitige as Priyantha
 Aruni Mendis as Nurse Nirupa
 S.I. Samarakkody as Asanga
 Sathis Wijemanne as Dr. Liyanage
 Chamanthi Wijemanne as Therapist Renuka
 Dileepa Abeysekera as Ravi
 Nalaka Gunawardene as Prof. Wijewardane
 Dulith Herath as Vishwa's Boss
 Kalana Gunasekara as Sumanarathna
 Ranjith Kadupitige as Priyantha

Accolades

Film festivals

Beijing International Film Festival 2015 (In Competition - Forward Future)
Shangai International Film Festival 2015 (Official Selection)
International Film Festival of India, Goa 2015 (Official Selection)
International Film Festival of Kerala 2015 (Official Selection)
Palm Beach International Film Festival 2016 (Official Selection)
London Indian Film Festival 2016 (Official Selection)
Chicago South Asian Film Festival 2016 (In Competition)
El Ojo Kojo International Film Festival, Madrid 2016 (Official Selection)
Bengaluru International Film Festival 2016 (Asian Competition)
Cayman Islands International Film Festival 2016 (Best First Film Competition)
Delhi International Film Festival 2015 (Official Selection)
International Film Festival of Colombo 2015 (In Competition)
Jaffna International Cinema Festival 2015 (In Competition)
Idyllwild International Festival of Cinema, California US 2017 (In Competition)
Pune International Film Festival 2017 (Official Selection)

Production
The film was shot in around the city Colombo and at National National Institute of Mental Health, Colombo, Sri Lanka. The shooting schedule of Premaya Nam began on 21 March 2013 and it ended on 21 April 2015.

Soundtrack

References

External links
 
විශ්වගේ චරිතය රඟන්න පෙර මා මානසික රෝහලටත් ගියා
රාගයෙන් තොර සඳ එළිය සේ අචින්තයි පාරිශුද්ධයි
මං ලක්ෂ ගණන් සල්ලි අරන් සින්දු කියන ගායකයෙක් නොවේ
සම්මානය ක බර දරාගන්නේ කෙසේද

2015 films
2010s Sinhala-language films
Works by Prasanna Vithanage